Carnwath is a surname. Notable people include:

 Alison Carnwath (born 1953), British businesswoman
 Sir Andrew Carnwath (1909 – 1995), British banker
 Francis Carnwath (born 1940), director of the Greenwich Foundation for the Royal Naval College
 Robert Carnwath, Lord Carnwath of Notting Hill (born 1945), British Supreme Court judge
 Squeak Carnwath (born 1947), American painter and arts educator